Milovan Petar Mirošević Albornoz (born 20 June 1980) is a Chilean football manager and former footballer. He spent the majority of his playing career as an attacking midfielder for Universidad Católica. He is also commonly known as Milo Mirosevic.

Club career
Mirošević began his football career with one of the biggest Chilean football clubs Universidad Católica in 1992. His professional debut at the age of 17 in 1997 occurred in part due to a strike by professional footballers which saw players of the youth squads compete in the Torneo Apertura 1997. Mirošević's debut with Catolica ended in a 4–1 win over rivals Colo-Colo at Estadio San Carlos de Apoquindo.

in 2000, after two seasons with the reserves team, Mirošević became a regular in Católica's starting eleven. In 2002, under coach Juvenal Olmos, Mirosevic was the star of the club's win of the Apertura.

After 2002 he was transferred to Racing Club of Argentina where he obtained mixed results. He was then transferred from Racing to Beitar Jerusalem FC, winning the 2006–07 Israeli Premier League.  In 2008, he returned to Argentina signing with Argentinos Juniors. Mirošević finally returned to Universidad Católica in June 2008 as one of the new players brought in for the Clausura Tournament. He holds the current record of scoring in 5 consecutive matches against Universidad de Chile. In his time back with Católica he helped the club capture the league title in 2010 and the 2011 Copa Chile.

On 4 January 2012 Mirošević joined Major League Soccer club Columbus Crew on a multi-year deal. However, hs stay in Columbus lasted only one season and he was released by the club on 20 January 2013. Immediately upon his release Mirošević signed with one of his former sides, Universidad Católica.

International career
He represented Chile U17 at the 1997 South American U-17 Championship and Chile U20 at the 1999 South American U-20 Championship. In addition, he played for Chile B against England B on 10 February 1998. Chile won by 2–1.

Mirosevic received his first opportunity with the Chile national team under Juvenal Olmos' tenure as manager. During these World Cup qualifying games, Mirošević scored twice, once against Argentina and once against Uruguay.

During the 2010 World Cup qualifiers, Marcelo Bielsa called Mirosevic up for the first games against Uruguay and Paraguay, without getting the chance to play. After four years of not being called up by the national team, on 10 November 2011, he was called up by Claudio Borghi to fill in after some suspensions were in effect, getting the chance to play as a substitute during one of the games.

Managerial career
Despite he graduated as a Football Manager, he didn't accept an offer to make an internship at the C.D. Universidad Católica, but he has worked as Promotion Coordinator for the youth players of the same club. In April 2022, he left his job at the Universidad Católica to begin his managerial career as the assistant coach of Patricio Ormazábal of Chile U20.

Personal life
He is the cousin of the deputy Vlado Mirosevic.

Titles
 Universidad Católica
 Primera División: 2002-A, 2010, 2016-C
 Copa Chile: 2011
 Supercopa de Chile: 2016

Beitar Jerusalem
 Ligat Ha'al: 2007

References

External links

1980 births
Living people
Chilean people of Croatian descent
Chilean footballers
Footballers from Santiago
Chilean expatriate footballers
Chile international footballers
Chile under-20 international footballers
Chile youth international footballers
Club Deportivo Universidad Católica footballers
Racing Club de Avellaneda footballers
Beitar Jerusalem F.C. players
Argentinos Juniors footballers
Columbus Crew players
Unión Española footballers
Chilean Primera División players
Argentine Primera División players
Israeli Premier League players
Major League Soccer players
Expatriate footballers in Argentina
Expatriate footballers in Israel
Expatriate soccer players in the United States
2004 Copa América players
Chilean expatriate sportspeople in Argentina
Chilean expatriate sportspeople in Israel
Chilean expatriate sportspeople in the United States
Association football midfielders
Chilean football managers
People from Santiago